Stagecoach Grimsby-Cleethorpes is a subdivision of Stagecoach East Midlands that operates buses in and around North East Lincolnshire, England, serving a population of over 150,000. It runs town services in its main hubs of Grimsby and Cleethorpes, as well as services to Immingham and nearby villages. Buses operate via the Riverhead bus station, opened in 1989, which is situated next to the Freshney Place Shopping Centre in Grimsby town centre.

History

Grimsby and Cleethorpes Corporations

In 1881 the London-based Provincial Tramways Company established a system of horse trams in Grimsby and Cleethorpes under the management of the Great Grimsby Street Tramways Company. Provincial also operated tramways in Cardiff, Portsmouth, Gosport and Plymouth. These horse trams would be withdrawn in 1901 and replaced with electric trams.

In 1925 Grimsby Corporation bought the tramway system running within its borough for £125,000. However, faced with the expense of relaying damaged track on Freeman Street, the new company acquired single deck Garrett and later double deck AEC trolleybuses, with trolleybus services first operating on 3 October 1926. This started the gradual process of replacing the ageing trams with the Grimsby trolleybus system.

In 1927, Grimsby Corporation Transport bought its first motor buses, these being centre entrance single deck Albions. The first double deck motor bus, an AEC Regent with a centre entrance, was purchased in 1930. Grimsby Corporation introduced motor bus routes to outlying areas of the town and in 1934 bought routes from the Ada bus company and Provincial, thereby extending services to New Waltham/Humberston (route 8) and Waltham (route 9). Following World War Two, routes were further extended to the new housing estates.

Cleethorpes Council introduced motor buses in 1930, operating routes within the town and also to Humberston. A joint service with Grimsby (route 6) ran from Grimsby town centre, along Bargate, Weelsby Road and Clee Road to Cleethorpes Bathing Pool. In 1936 Cleethorpes took over the tramways within its area and in 1937 tram services run by the two boroughs finally ended, when a second joint service (route 11) was established along the main road between Grimsby Old Market Place and Cleethorpes Bathing Pool using trolley buses.

Grimsby-Cleethorpes Transport (GCT)

In 1953, plans to amalgamate both Grimsby and Cleethorpes' transport departments were first explored. However, Cleethorpes' department's managing director was initially opposed to the plan, and so discussions continued until an agreement was made in 1957. Both councils then merged their bus companies to form Grimsby-Cleethorpes Transport (GCT), run by a joint committee. The crimson/cream livery of Grimsby and the blue/grey colours of Cleethorpes were replaced with the blue and cream of the new company. The Cleethorpes depot at Pelham Road was closed down, the buses and staff moving to the Grimsby depot in Victoria Street.

Prior to the amalgamation in 1956, Grimsby introduced its first one-person operated service on its Corporation Road route 1, using new dual entrance single deckers The last trolleybuses were taken out of service in 1960. During the 1960s the first rear-engined Daimler Fleetline double deckers arrived. These had the driver inside, with automatic doors opposite where they sat. Later dual-door Fleetlines were acquired and these were used to gradually extend the one-person operated bus system to the double deck routes. In 1982 the role of conductor was abolished and Grimsby-Cleethorpes Transport changed entirely to one-man operations.

1981 saw GCT change its livery to caramel and cream. In 1986 bus services were deregulated, which resulted in some competition between RoadCar and GCT. RoadCar began running buses from Grimsby town centre to the Grange, Nunsthorpe and Bradley Park estates, areas previously served only by GCT.  In 1987 the fleet colours were changed again, to orange and white.

Resulting from government policy that municipal transport undertakings should be privatised, Grimsby and Cleethorpes councils decided to sell off GCT. Bids submitted included offers from Stagecoach, Yorkshire Rider and a management/worker team. The Stagecoach bid was accepted and on 19 November 1993, Stagecoach Holdings bought the company for £4.4 million. The company was soon rebranded to Stagecoach Grimsby-Cleethorpes and initially made part of the East Midland division, before the 2007 acquisition of Lincolnshire Roadcar lead to Grimsby-Cleethorpes being amalgamated into the Stagecoach in Lincolnshire subdivision.

Following the acquisition of Lincolnshire RoadCar, buses and staff based at the former RoadCar's Grimsby depot in Garden Street were transferred to the Stagecoach Grimsby-Cleethorpes depot in Victoria Street, although they remained part of Stagecoach in Lincolnshire. The Garden Street premises was briefly used for the storage of old buses before being put up for sale in 2008, where in that same year, Stagecoach closed its Louth depot transferred operations of Louth-area routes over to Grimsby-Cleethorpes.

On 6 October 2002, arsonists started a fire at the Victoria Street bus depot, damaging or destroying 17 buses.

Services

Simplibus network
Prior to 2014, bus services in Grimsby-Cleethorpes operated on most of the traditional route numbers from Grimsby-Cleethorpes Transport, with some alterations.

In November 2014, Stagecoach Grimsby-Cleethorpes became the first Stagecoach East Midlands subsidiary to launch a 'Simplibus' network. This involved the renumbering of most services into numerical order, as well as the rerouting or withdrawal of some services. This coincided with a £4 million investment of 28 new single-deck buses for the fleet, all delivered new with Simplibus branding.

InterConnect network
Stagecoach Grimsby-Cleethorpes are one of the operators that run 'InterConnect' services, which are a network of rural and interurban bus services around the county. Grimsby operate 2 of these services, 51 to Louth and 53 to Lincoln, via Market Rasen.

The 51 service to Louth is ran hourly during weekdays from Grimsby to Louth via Holton le Clay, while the 53 service to Lincoln is ran every 2 hours during weekdays from Grimsby to Lincoln via Laceby, Market Rasen and Welton. Both services uses InterConnect liveried Wright Eclipse Urbans. The 53 service is also shared with Stagecoach in Lincolnshire's Lincoln depot, who operate several journeys throughout the day.

250 to Hull
Stagecoach Grimsby operate the weekday hourly 250 service from Cleethorpes, via Grimsby, Laceby, Keelby, Barton upon Humber and the Humber Bridge to Hull. Originally, the route also served Humberside Airport and so was branded the 'Humber Flyer', with the service being upgraded to four route-branded single deckers in 2014.

In September 2020, the 250 was rerouted to no longer serve Humberside Airport, instead serving the villages of Barrow upon Humber, Thornton Curtis, Wootton and Ulceby. With the advent of a new national livery scheme, Stagecoach Grimsby-Cleethorpes have currently begun a process of phasing out the 'Humber Flyer' brand.

Phone 'n' Ride
Stagecoach Grimsby-Cleethorpes are contracted by North East Lincolnshire Council to run the 'Phone 'n' Ride' demand-responsive transport service. First established by the council in 2005, this is currently operated with a fleet of Mercedes-Benz Sprinter minibuses, which operate around Grimsby, Cleethorpes and surrounding areas.

References

Further reading
 100 Years of Public Transport, 1881–1981 (Grimsby-Cleethorpes Transport)

Stagecoach Group bus operators in England
Bus operators in Lincolnshire
Borough of North East Lincolnshire
Companies based in Grimsby